The Ambrose Burton House, located on Unity Rd. near Harrodsburg, Kentucky, was listed on the National Register of Historic Places in 1983.

It is believed to have been built by Ambrose Burton in 1798. The house is a two-story log building with a single room on each floor.

References

Houses on the National Register of Historic Places in Kentucky
Houses in Mercer County, Kentucky
National Register of Historic Places in Mercer County, Kentucky
1798 establishments in Kentucky
Houses completed in 1798
Log buildings and structures on the National Register of Historic Places in Kentucky
Log houses in the United States